The Merchant Marine Gallant Ship Citation is an award of the United States Merchant Marine.  The award is presented as a bronze plaque to vessels, with officers and crew being awarded a ribbon bar to denote the award.  Both United States flagged vessels and foreign flagged vessels are eligible for the award.

Criteria
The Gallant Ship Citation is awarded by the Secretary of Transportation to vessels, including foreign vessels, for, "participating in outstanding or gallant action in a marine disaster or other emergency to save life or property at sea."

A bronze Gallant Ship Citation Plaque is awarded to the vessels.  The officers and crew who served on those vessels designated as Gallant Ships are awarded a citation ribbon bar.  At the center of the ribbon is a silver seahorse device.

Gallant Ships 

World War II
 , actions on September 27, 1942 
 SS Adoniram Judson, actions in October 1944, presented December 10, 1944 
 SS Samuel Parker, actions in February 1943 
 SS Cedar Mills, actions in December 1943
 SS William Moultrie
 SS Marcus Daly, actions in October 1944
 SS Virginia Dare
 SS Nathaniel Greene
 SS Stanvac Calcutta, actions on June 6, 1942

Post-World War II
 , actions in December 1950, presented August 24, 1960 
 SS Cape Ann, presented October 23, 1957 
 , presented October 23, 1957
 , presented October 23, 1957
 MV Western Pioneer, presented June 29, 1961
 SS Dolly Turman, presented August 14, 1963 
 Japan Bear, actions in 1963
 SS Philippine Mail, presented February 28, 1964
 SS President Wilson, presented April 1, 1965
 SS Cotton State, actions in February 1965, presented 1967
 Tug Adeline Foss, actions in November 1965, presented 1967 
 Tug Julia C. Moran, actions on June 16, 1966, presented 1968 
 SS President McKinley, actions on January 5, 1967, presented 1968 
 West German ship Mathilde Bolten, actions on December 20, 1964, presented 1969
 West German ship Weissenburg, actions on May 7, 1965, presented 1969 
 , actions on January 14, 1970
 MS Khian Star, actions on December 26, 1969, presented 1971
 FDNY Fire Fighter actions on May 30, 1973, presented May 22, 1975
 TT Williamsburgh, actions on October 4, 1980, presented May 21, 1981
 MV San Francisco, actions on October 31, 1984, presented 1984
 Tug Stamford, actions on May 5, 1986, presented 1989
 MV Green Lake, actions on December 31, 2018, presented 2019

References

External links
 Gallant Ships of World War II Merchant Marine - Retrieved 20 March 2007
 Laws Establishing Merchant Marine Medals
 

Awards and decorations of the United States Merchant Marine
Awards established in 1944
Ribbon symbolism
1944 establishments in the United States